In music theory, a dominant seventh chord, or major minor seventh chord, is a seventh chord, usually built on the fifth degree of the major scale, and composed of a root, major third, perfect fifth, and minor seventh.  Thus it is a major triad together with a minor seventh, denoted by the letter name of the chord root and a superscript "7". An example is the dominant seventh chord built on G, written as G7, having pitches G–B–D–F:

Dominant seventh chords contain a strong dissonance – a tritone between the chord's third and seventh. 

Dominant seventh chords are often built on the fifth scale degree (or dominant) of a key. For instance, in the C major scale, G is the fifth note of the scale, and the seventh chord built on G is the dominant seventh chord, G7 (shown above). In this chord, F is a minor seventh above G. In Roman numeral analysis, G7 would be represented as V7 in the key of C major. 

Similarly, this chord also occurs on the seventh degree of any natural minor scale (e.g., G7 in A minor). 

The dominant seventh is perhaps the most important of the seventh chords. It was the first seventh chord to appear regularly in classical music. The V7 chord is found almost as often as the V, the dominant triad, and typically functions to drive the piece strongly toward a resolution to the tonic of the key.

A dominant seventh chord can be represented by the integer notation {0, 4, 7, 10} relative to the dominant.

History
Renaissance composers conceived of harmony in terms of intervals rather than chords, "however, certain dissonant sonorities suggest that the dominant seventh chord occurred with some frequency." Monteverdi (usually credited as the first to use the V7 chord without preparation) and other early Baroque composers begin to treat the V7 as a chord as part of the introduction of functional harmony.

An excerpt from Monteverdi's "Lasciatemi Morire", Lamento d'Arianna (1608) is shown below. In it, a  dominant seventh chord (in red) is handled conservatively, "prepared and resolved as a suspension, clearly indicating its dissonant status."

The V7 was in constant use during the Classical period, with similar treatment to that of the Baroque. In the Romantic period, freer voice-leading was gradually developed, leading to the waning of functional use in the post-Romantic and Impressionistic periods including more dissonant dominant chords through higher extensions and lessened use of the major minor chord's dominant function. Twentieth-century classical music either consciously used functional harmony or was entirely free of V7 chords while jazz and popular musics continued to use functional harmony including V7 chords.

An excerpt from Chopin's Mazurka in F minor (1849), Op. 68, No. 4, mm. 1–4 is shown below with dominant sevenths in red: "the seventh factor had by this time achieved nearly consonant status."

Use

Inversions
{|class="wikitable"
|-
! Inversion !! Bottom note!! Roman numerals !! Macro analysis
|-
| Root position || root: 5 || V7 || in C: G7
|-
| First || 3rd: 7 || V || in C: G
|-
| Second || 5th: 2 || V || in C: G
|-
| Third || 7th: 4 || V or V2 || in C: G or G2
|}

The opening bars of Mozart’s Piano Sonata in C, K545 features dominant seventh chords in both second and first inversions:The concluding cadence of the same movement features the chord in root position:A striking use of inversions of the dominant seventh can be found in this passage from the first movement of Beethoven’s  String Quartet Op. 127. Here, the second and third inversions contribute to the "magnificently rich harmony" :

Function

The function of the dominant seventh chord is to resolve to the tonic note or chord.

This dominant seventh chord is useful to composers because it contains both a major triad and the interval of a tritone. The major triad confers a very "strong" sound. The tritone is created by the co-occurrence of the third degree and seventh degree (e.g., in the G7 chord, the interval between B and F is a tritone).

In a diatonic context, the third of the chord is the leading-tone of the scale, which has a strong tendency to pull towards the tonic of the key (e.g., in C, the third of G7, B, is the leading tone of the key of C). The seventh of the chord acts as an upper leading-tone to the third of the scale (in C: the seventh of G7, F, is a half-step above and leads down to E). This, in combination with the strength of root movement by fifth, and the natural resolution of the dominant triad to the tonic triad (e.g., from GBD to CEG in the key of C major), creates a resolution with which to end a piece or a section, often in a cadence.

Because of this original usage, it also quickly became an easy way to trick the listener's ear with a deceptive cadence. The dominant seventh may work as part of a circle progression, preceded by the supertonic chord, ii.

Importantly, non-diatonic dominant seventh chords (sometimes called a chromatic seventh), borrowed from another key, can allow the composer to modulate to that other key. This technique is extremely common, particularly since the Classical period, and has led to further innovative uses of the dominant seventh chord such as secondary dominant (V7/V, shown below), extended dominant (V7/V/V), and substitute dominant (V7/V) chords.

Voice leading
For common practice voice leading or "strict resolution" of the dominant seventh chord:
 In the V7–I resolution, the dominant, leading note, and supertonic resolve to the tonic, whereas the subdominant resolves to the mediant.

 In the other resolutions, the dominant remains stationary, the leading note and supertonic resolve to the tonic, and the subdominant resolves to the mediant.

 All four tones may be present, though the root may be doubled and the fifth omitted.
 The diminished fifth (if the seventh is above the third, as in the first measure below) resolves inwards while the augmented fourth (if the seventh is below the third, as in the second measure below) resolves outward. This means that the seventh resolves stepwise downwards while the third resolves upwards to the tonic though in such cases the root of the tonic chord may need to be tripled.

 The root of the V7, when in the bass, resolves to the root of the I, in the bass.
 In an incomplete V7, with a missing fifth, the doubled root remains stationary.
 The "free resolution of the seventh" features the seventh in an inner voice moving stepwise upwards to the fifth of I

According to Heinrich Schenker, "The dissonance is always passing, never a chord member (Zusammenklang),'" and often (though by no means always) the voice leading suggests either a passing note:
8 7 3
5 5 1

or resolution of a (hypothetical) suspension:
(8) 7 3
(4) 5 1

In blues progressions 
In rock and popular music songs following the blues progression, the IV and V chords are "almost always" dominant seventh chords (sometimes with extensions) with the tonic chord most often being a major triad. Examples include Bill Haley and the Comets' "Rock Around the Clock" and Buster Brown's "Fanny Mae", while in Chuck Berry's "Back in the U.S.A." and Loggins and Messina's "Your Mama Don't Dance" the tonic chord is also a dominant seventh. Used mostly in the first fifteen years of the rock era and now sounding somewhat "retrospective" (e.g., Oasis' "Roll With It"), other examples of tonic dominant seventh chords include Little Richard's "Lucille", The Beatles' "I Saw Her Standing There", Nilsson's "Coconut", Jim Croce's "You Don't Mess Around With Jim", and The Drifters' "On Broadway". Chuck Berry's "Rock and Roll Music" uses the dominant seventh on I, IV, and V.

Related chords
The dominant seventh is enharmonically equivalent to the German sixth. For example, the German sixth A–C–E–F (which typically resolves to G) is equivalent to the dominant seventh A–C–E–G (which typically resolves to D):

 

The dominant seventh chord is frequently used to approximate a harmonic seventh chord, which is one possible just tuning, in the ratios 4:5:6:7 , for the dominant seventh. Others include 20:25:30:36 , found on I, and 36:45:54:64, found on V, used in 5-limit just tunings and scales.

Today, the dominant seventh chord enjoys particular prominence in the music of barbershop quartets, with the Barbershop Harmony Society describing the chord as the "signature" of the barbershop sound. A song may use the chord type (built on any scale degree, not just ), for up to 30 percent of its duration. As barbershop singers strive to harmonize in just intonation to maximize the audibility of harmonic overtones, the practical sonority of the chord tends to be that of a harmonic seventh chord. This chord type has become so ingrained into the fabric of the artform that it is often referred to as the "barbershop seventh chord" by those who practice it.

Tuning
{|class="wikitable"
|-
! Chord !! Notation !! Seventh !! Ratios
|-
| Tonic seventh chord || C E G  || Minor seventh || 20:25:30:36
|-
| Harmonic seventh chord || G B D  || Harmonic seventh || 4:5:6:7
|-
| German sixth chord ||  C   || Harmonic seventh  || 4:5:6:7
|-
| Dominant seventh chord || G B D F || Pythagorean minor seventh || 36:45:54:64
|}

Dominant seventh chord table
{|class="wikitable"
!bgcolor=#dddddd|Chord
!bgcolor=#dddddd|Root
!bgcolor=#dddddd|Major third
!bgcolor=#dddddd|Perfect fifth
!bgcolor=#dddddd|Minor seventh
|-
!C7
|C
|E
|G
|B
|-
!C7
|C
|E (F)
|G
|B
|-
!D7
|D
|F
|A
|C (B)
|-
!D7
|D
|F
|A
|C
|-
!D7
|D
|F (G)
|A
|C
|-
!E7
|E
|G
|B
|D
|-
!E7
|E
|G
|B
|D
|-
!F7
|F
|A
|C
|E
|-
!F7
|F
|A
|C
|E
|-
!G7
|G
|B
|D
|F (E)
|-
!G7
|G
|B
|D
|F
|-
!G7
|G
|B (C)
|D
|F
|-
!A7
|A
|C
|E
|G
|-
!A7
|A
|C
|E
|G
|-
!A7
|A
|C (D)
|E (F)
|G
|-
!B7
|B
|D
|F
|A
|-
!B7
|B
|D
|F
|A
|-
|}

Guitar chord diagrams
In standard tuning, the left is the low E string. x means mute the string.

Dominant 7
 A7: x02020
 B7: x21202
 C7: x3231x
 D7: xx0212
 E7: 020100
 F7: 131211
 G7: 320001

Dominant 7 Sus2
 A7sus2: x02000
 B7sus2: x24222
 C7sus2: x30333
 D7sus2: x57555
 E7sus2: x79777
 F7sus2: xx3543
 G7sus2: 303033

Dominant 7 Sus4
 A7sus4: x00030
 B7sus4: x24252
 C7sus4: x35363
 D7sus4: xx0013
 E7sus4: 020200
 F7sus4: 111311
 G7sus4: 330011

See also
 Dominant ninth, etc.
 Irregular resolution
 Nondominant seventh chord
 Subtonic
 Mixolydian mode

Notes

References

External links

 Dominant Chords Theory and applications for jazz guitar

Dominant chords
Seventh chords